Juan Bautista Morillo (born November 5, 1983) is a Dominican former professional baseball pitcher. He played in the  All-Star Futures Game in Detroit.

Morillo has a 95-100 mph fastball, but his slider is inconsistent and his control is below average.

Morillo made the opening-day roster of the Colorado Rockies in 2009. On April 10, Morillo was designated for assignment by the Rockies to make way for Matt Belisle.

He was claimed off waivers by the Minnesota Twins on April 17, 2009, replacing Philip Humber who was designated for assignment.

On Thursday, April 29, 2009, Morillo was designated for assignment to make room for Joe Mauer, who was coming back from a back injury suffered before spring training.

On November 17, 2009, Morillo signed to play with the Tohoku Rakuten Golden Eagles of the Japanese Pacific League.

Morillo opened the 2012 season with Double-A Reading.

In November 2015, he was selected to the roster for the Dominican Republic national baseball team at the 2015 WBSC Premier12.

References

External links

Recap of the 2005 All-Star Futures Game in Detroit, MI
Short article on Juan Morillo, from Baseball America

1983 births
Living people
Asheville Tourists players
Colorado Rockies players
Colorado Springs Sky Sox players
Dominican Republic expatriate baseball players in Japan
Dominican Republic expatriate baseball players in Mexico
Dominican Republic expatriate baseball players in Taiwan
Dominican Republic expatriate baseball players in the United States
Dominican Republic national baseball team players
EDA Rhinos players

Lehigh Valley IronPigs players
Major League Baseball players from the Dominican Republic
Major League Baseball pitchers
Mexican League baseball pitchers
Minnesota Twins players
Modesto Nuts players
Nippon Professional Baseball pitchers
Reading Phillies players
Rochester Red Wings players
Tohoku Rakuten Golden Eagles players
Tri-City Dust Devils players
Tulsa Drillers players
Vaqueros Laguna players
2015 WBSC Premier12 players
Azucareros del Este players
Bowie Baysox players
Casper Rockies players
Leones del Escogido players
Toros del Este players